Morina longifolia, the Himalayan whorlflower or long-leaved whorlflower, is a species of flowering plant in the family Caprifoliaceae, native to the foothills of the Himalayas. A perennial hardy to USDA zone 6a, it is recommended for borders and beds, in courtyard, cottage, gravel and rock gardens, but is subject to rot if there is too much shade. Its habitats include open slopes and alpine shrubberies.

References

Caprifoliaceae
Garden plants of Asia
Flora of Pakistan
Flora of West Himalaya
Flora of Nepal
Flora of East Himalaya
Flora of Tibet
Plants described in 1830